Dutch Hollow Lake is a man-made reservoir located in the Town of La Valle, (Sauk County), Wisconsin, United States. Created by developers in the 1970s by impounding the water of Dutch Hollow Creek, it is now a public-access lake regulated by the Wisconsin Department of Natural Resources with two public-access ramps.  The 40-foot (12 m) depth of the lake is maintained both by the flow from Dutch Hollow Creek and the pumping of groundwater.

History
Construction of the dam began in the year 1970 by Branigar Lake Properties of Wisconsin. Fish varieties were initially stocked into Dutch Hollow Lake. Now the lake has a balance of Northern Pike, Walleye, Large Mouth Bass, Yellow Perch, Crappie, Bluegill, and other Sunfish.

Geography
Dutch Hollow Lake (Lat. 43 degrees/Long. 90 degrees) has an elevation of 951 feet (290 m). It is northwest of the city of Reedsburg, with the city of Wisconsin Dells thirty minutes away.

Environment
Dutch Hollow Lake is a drainage lake. This means that the lake has both an inlet and an outlet and the main source of water is drainage from the stream. The shoreline goes for about eight and a half miles and is a bottom draw dam, which means water is taken from the bottom and transferred downstream. This allows cooler water for the downstream fish and cattle.

References

Bibliography 
U.S. Army Corps of Engineers. Dams and Reservoirs List, Washington, DC. 08-Sep-1981. A listing of impounded bodies of water and associated information.
 
 Satellite view and a lake photo.

External links 

Lakes of Sauk County, Wisconsin
Reservoirs in Wisconsin
Buildings and structures in Sauk County, Wisconsin
Protected areas of Sauk County, Wisconsin